Kelly Run is a  long 1st order tributary to Sewickley Creek in Westmoreland County, Pennsylvania.

Course
Kelly Run rises about 0.5 miles south of Herminie, Pennsylvania, and then flows southwest to join Sewickley Creek at Hutchinson.

Watershed

See also 
 List of rivers of Pennsylvania

References

 
Tributaries of the Ohio River
Rivers of Pennsylvania
Rivers of Westmoreland County, Pennsylvania
Allegheny Plateau